Ustad Rashid Khan (born 1 July 1968) is an Indian classical musician in the Hindustani music tradition.  He belongs to the Rampur-Sahaswan gharana, and is the great-grandson of gharana founder Inayat Hussain Khan. He is married to Soma Khan.

In a story told in several versions, Pandit Bhimsen Joshi once remarked that Rashid Khan was the "assurance for the future of Indian vocal music". He was awarded the Padma Shri, as well as the Sangeet Natak Akademi Award in 2006. He was awarded the Padma Bhushan, India's third highest civilian award, in 2022 by the Indian Government in the field of Art.

Early life
Born in Sahaswan, Badayun, Uttar Pradesh. He received his initial training from his maternal grand-uncle, Ustad Nissar Hussain Khan (1909–1993).  He is also the nephew of Ustad Ghulam Mustafa Khan.

As a child he had little interest in music. His uncle Ghulam Mustafa Khan was among the first to note his musical talents, and for some time trained him in Mumbai. However, he received his main training from Nissar Hussain Khan, initially at his house in Badayun.  A strict disciplinarian, Nissar Hussain Khan would insist on voice training (Swar Sadhana) from four in the morning, and make Rashid practice one note of the scale for hours on end. A whole day would be spent on practising just a single note.  Although Rashid detested these lessons as a child, but the disciplined training shows in his easy mastery of taan and layakaari today.
It was not until he was 18 that Rashid began to truly enjoy his musical training.

Career
Rashid Khan gave his first concert at age eleven, and the following year, 1978, he performed at an ITC concert in Delhi.
In April 1980, when Nissar Hussain Khan moved to the ITC Sangeet Research Academy (SRA), Calcutta, Rashid Khan also joined the academy at the age of 14. By 1994, he was acknowledged as a musician (a formal process) at the academy.

Musical style
The Rampur-Sahaswan gayaki (style of singing) is closely related to the Gwalior gharana, which features medium-slow tempos, a full-throated voice and intricate rhythmic play.
Rashid Khan includes the slow elaboration in his vilambit khayals in the manner of his maternal grand-uncle and also developed exceptional expertise in the use of sargams and sargam taankari (play on the scale). He is influenced with the style of Amir Khan and Bhimsen Joshi.

He is also a master of the tarana like his guru but sings them in his own manner, preferring the khayal style rather than the instrumental stroke-based style for which Nissar Hussain was famous. There is no imitation of instrumental tone.

His renderings stand out for the emotional overtones in his melodic elaboration.  He says: "The emotional content may be in the alaap, sometimes while singing the bandish, or while giving expression to the meaning of the lyrics." This brings a touch of modernity to his style, as compared to the older maestros, who tended to place greater emphasis on impressive technique and skilful execution of difficult passages.

Rashid Khan has also experimented with fusing pure Hindustani music with lighter musical genres, e.g. in the Sufi fusion recording Naina Piya Se (songs of Amir Khusro), or in experimental concerts with western instrumentalist Louis Banks. He has also performed jugalbandis, along with sitarist Shahid Parvez and others.

Film discography

Non-film discography
 Classical Wonders of India (2015)
 Krishna - Ustad Rashid Khan (2013)
 Rashid Again (2013)
 Baithaki Rabi - Ustad Rashid Khan (2012)
 Poore Se Zara Sa Kam Hai – Mausam
 Nirgun (2010)
 Kabir (2009)
 Shabad Kirtan Gurbani - Sawan Aaya Hey Sakhi from album (Guru Manyo Granth)(2008)
 Shabad Kirtan Gurbani  - Holi Kini Sant Sev from album (Guru Manyo Granth)(2008)
 Hey Bhagwan - Ustad Rashid Khan
 Master Pieces Ustad Rashid Khan (2006)
 Yearning (2006)
 Reflection (2006)
 Masterworks From the NCPA Archives: Rashid Khan
 The Song of Shiva
 Morning Mantra (2003)
 Morning Mantra (2003)
 Selection - Raga - Megh and Hansadhwani (2002)
 Voice of India (2002)
 Yatra – A Journey of Rabindrasangeet & Hindustani Classical Bandish, with Nachiketa Chakraborty
 Naina Piya Se
 Live in Concert: Moreton Centre (2000)
 A Maestro in the Making (2000)
 The Genius of Rashid Khan (2000)
 The Song of Shiva (2000)
 In London (2000)
 Classical Vocal: Ustad Rashid Khan (Live At Savai Gandharva Festival, Pune) (1999)
 Saajan More Ghar Aao (Live) (1998)
 Selection - Kaushi Kanada - Charukeshi - Barwan (1996)
 Khyal (1996)
 Shyam Kalyan - Ustad Rashid Khan (1996)
 Rashid Khan Live In Concert (1995)
 Rashid Khan - Ustad Rashid Khan (1995)
 A Tribute to a Living Legend (1995)
 Raga Yaman / Raga Kirwani (1994)
 Rashid Khan Live In Concert (1993)
 Raga Bageshri / Desh (1991)

Awards
 Padma Shri (2006)
 Sangeet Natak Akademi Award (2006)
 Global Indian Music Academy Awards (GIMA) (2010)
 Maha Sangeet Samman Award (2012)
 Mirchi Music Awards (2013)
Padma Bhushan (2022)

References

1966 births
Living people
Hindustani singers
People from Budaun
Recipients of the Padma Shri in arts
Recipients of the Sangeet Natak Akademi Award
Indian classical musicians of Bengal
Recipients of the Padma Bhushan in arts